Uğur Ersoy (born in 1932)  is a Turkish civil engineer and academic.

Life
He was born in Mersin. His father Yakup Ersoy was the local chairman of the Republican People's Party (CHP). After graduating from  Tarsus American Highschool,   he earned his BS degree at the civil engineering department of Boğaziçi University in 1955. Then he travelled to United States for further studies. He received both his Master’s and Ph.D. at the University of Texas at Austin.

Academic life
Between 1959 and 2006 he served in the academic staff of Middle East Technical University (METU) in Ankara  as an assistant professor, associate professor and then professor. During this period he also served in other universities; as a researcher at The University of Texas at Austin between 1963-1965; as a visiting professor at University of Toronto between 1980-1981; as a visiting professor at Boğaziçi University between 1992-1994.  He has been involved in experimental research on the behavior of reinforced and precast concrete structures. In 2006 he moved to Istanbul and became a member of Boğaziçi University staff.

In university administration
In METU  he served three times as the dean of the Civil Engineering  Faculty and two times as the vice rector.  He also served as the dean of the newly established Mersin campus of METU between 1975-1976.

Publications
He is the author of a number of books.  His technical books are in English and Turkish. 
	 An Introduction to Limit Design (Published by the METU Civil Engineering Society), 1962.
	 Betonarme Kesitlerin Taşıma Gücüne Göre Hesabı, (Published by METU),  1971. (co-author)
	 Betonarme - Temel İlkeler ve Hesap Yöntemleri,  1975.(co-author)
	 Betonarmede Burulma, 1975.
	 Taşıma Gücü El Kitabı,(Published by Ministry of Environment and Urban Planning (Turkey))
	 Introductory Mechanics of Deformable Bodies, (Published by  METU), 1983.(co-author)
	 Betonarme - Temel İlkeler ve Taşıma Gücü Hesabı,  1985.
	 Reinforced Concrete, METU, 1986 (Reviewed in Concrete International, American Concrete Institute).
	 Yüksek yapıların Tasarım ve Yapımında İzlenecek Temel İlkeler, (Published by the Chamber of Civil Engineers, İzmir Branch) 1988.(co-author)
	 Betonarme 2 - Döşeme ve Temeller, 1995.
	 Betonarme, 2001.(co-author)

He also wrote nontechnical Turkish books such as recollections.

	"Bir Efsane Bir Demet Insan",("Legend,  a bundle of people"), 1995
	"Bir Zamanlar Mersin'de", ("Once in Mersin").
	"Ustalarimdan Ögrendiklerim", ("What I’ve learned from my masters"),1999.
	"Sislerin Ardindan Kaybolmayanlar", ("Those who are not lost behind the fog") 1999.
	"Bozkiri Yesertenler ("People who greened the steppes") 2003.
	"Erguvan Renkli Yillar,("Purple colored years"),2004
	"Gördüklerim, Duyduklarım ve Düşündüklerim ("What I’ve seen, heard and thought"), 2008

Awards
 American Concrete Institute, Wason Medal for Research, 1969
 METU Parlar Foundation Science Award, 1985
 Turkish Prefabricate Union  (TürkPrefabrik Birliği ) Award, 1992
 Turkish Education Association Rüştü Yüce Success in Profession Award, 2001
 University of Texas at Austin Academy of Distinguished Graduates Membership 2005
 Turkish Chamber of Civil Engineers Honorary Distinguished Engineer Award 2006

His name appeared in Honour Book of Engineers of Distinction published in the United States.

References

1932 births
Living people
People from Mersin
Turkish engineering academics
Boğaziçi University alumni
University of Texas alumni
Academic staff of Middle East Technical University
Academic staff of the University of Toronto
Academic staff of Boğaziçi University
METU Mustafa Parlar Foundation Science Award winners